The siege of Guanggu was fought between 409 and 410 AD between the Eastern Jin and Southern Yan dynasties of China. The conflict started when the Southern Yan ruler, Murong Chao, raided the Eastern Jin northern borders for prisoners. In response, the Eastern Jin regent Liu Yu launched a campaign against the Southern Yan. He defeated the Southern Yan army at the Battle of Linqu, then besieged their capital Guanggu. The siege only lasted for a few months and ended in the conquest of Southern Yan by the Eastern Jin.

References 

410
409
Jin dynasty (266–420)
Southern Yan